Larvik Håndballklubb, is a women's handball club from Larvik, Norway.

History
Larvik HK was founded  in 1990 as a merger of the handball departments in the two clubs Larvik Turn and Halsen. They played in the top division since 1992/93. During their first year they were close to relegation, but managed to remain on top. They saw their breakthrough the following season, as they won the league title in 1994, and played the Norwegian Cup final.

From the late 1990s, Larvik was the strongest team on the Norwegian women's handball scene over a period of about twenty years, winning the league 19 times and the cup 17 times between 1994 and 2017. Last time they lost a league match at home was on 14 March 1999 before their first defeat in 18 years came against Vipers Kristiansand on 29 March 2017. On 14 May 2011, the club won the Women's EHF Champions League title for the first time.

On 14 May 2019, exactly 8 years after winning the Champions League, the club was degraded to 1. divisjon, after losing their elite license due to financial reasons. In 2020 the club again qualified for REMA 1000-ligaen, the Top Division.

Kits

Results

Norway
Norwegian League
 Gold: 93/94, 96/97, 99/00, 00/01, 01/02, 02/03, 04/05, 05/06, 06/07, 07/08, 08/09, 09/10, 10/11, 11/12, 12/13, 13/14, 14/15, 15/16, 16/17
 Silver: 17/18

Norwegian Cup
 Gold: 95/96, 97/98, 99/00, 02/03, 03/04, 04/05, 2005, 2006, 2008, 2009, 2010, 2011, 2012, 2013, 2014, 2015, 2016.

Europe
EHF Champions League
 Gold: 10/11
 Silver: 12/13, 14/15

Cup Winners' Cup
 Gold: 04/05, 07/08
 Silver: 08/09
European Club Championship
 Bronze: 2008

Team

Current squad
Squad for the 2022-23 season

Goalkeepers
 1  Eli Smørgrav Skogstrand
 30  Ida Madeleine Devillée Walin 
 36  Ingrid Lauritzen
Wingers
LW
 6  Emma Skinnehaugen 
 23  Polina Gencheva
RW
 15  Guro Ramberg 
 77  Astrid Vasvik Løke
Line players
 5  Thea Karen Bakås
 18  Tirill Solumsmoen Mørch 
 25  Tiril Birgitte Rosenberg
 55  Heidi Løke

Back players
LB
 7  Emma Helland-Døvle
 11  Marianne Haugsted
 20  Ingrid Vinjevoll
 21  Silje Vinjevoll
 26  Maja Furu Sæteren
CB
 9  Kaja Kristensen
 10  Dorthe Groa
 22  Andrea Rønning
RB
 24  Amanda Kurtović
 27  Mie Rakstad

2023-2024 Transfers

 Joining

 Leaving

Technical staff
  Head coach: Eirik Haugdal
  Assistant coach: Ketil Arntzen
  Goalkeeping coach: Martin Reiersen
  Physiotherapeut: Jørgen Eia Bringedal

Notable former club and National Team players

  Tine Albertsen (2004–2014)
  Isabel Blanco
  Monica Vik Hansen
  Kristine Duvholt Havnås
  Elisabeth Hilmo
  Vigdis Hårsaker
  Kari Mette Johansen
  Ida Bjørndalen Karlsson (2005–2007)
  Tonje Larsen (1993–1998, 1999–2015)
  Cecilie Leganger (2010–2014)
  Heidi Løke (2000–2002, 2008–2011, 2022–) 
  Kristine Moldestad
  Nora Mørk (2009–2016)
  Katja Nyberg (1998–2005, 2010–2012)
  Terese Pedersen
  Cathrine Roll-Matthiesen
  Lina Olsson Rosenberg
  Mimi Kopperud Slevigen
  Linn Jørum Sulland (2009–2015)
  Birgitte Sættem
  Annette Tveter
  Gro Hammerseng-Edin (2010–2017)
  Anja Hammerseng-Edin
  Karoline Dyhre Breivang (2005–2017)
  Amanda Kurtović (2011–2012, 2015–2017, 2022–)
  Marit Malm Frafjord (2014–2017)
  Sanna Solberg (2014–2017)
  Thea Mørk (2010–2018)
  Kristine Breistøl (2012–2018)
  Linn-Kristin Riegelhuth Koren (2002–2009, 2010–2017)
  Mari Molid (2014–2016, 2018–2019)
  Emilie Christensen (2017–2019)
  Merete Møller
  Lene Rantala (1997–2014)
  Karen Brødsgaard
  Kristina Bille
  Sandra Toft (2014–2017) 
  Gabriela Moreschi
  Tamires Morena Lima
  Raphaëlle Tervel
  Cassandra Tollbring (2017–2019)
  Alma Hasanić Grizović

Notable former club players

  Inger Sofie Heieraas 
  Line Eftang
  Vibeke Nesse 
  Cathrine Haakestad 
  Heidi Flaatnes 
  Lene Lillevik
  Monica Meland
  Sara Breistøl
  Vilde Johansen
  Jenny Osnes Græsholt
  Mari Finstad Bergum
  Karoline Lund
  Hege Løken
  Martine Wolff
  Maria Hjertner
  Mathilde Rivas Toft
  June Andenæs
  Guro Rundbråten
  Tiril Merg
  Tonje Berglie
  Hanna Åhlén
  Elinore Johansson
  Esmeralda Fetahovic

Coaches
  Peter Berthelsen (June 1, 1990–June 1, 1992)
  Marit Breivik (June 1, 1992–June 1, 1994)
  Gunnar Pettersen (June 1, 1994–June 1, 1996)
  Kristjan Halldórsson (June 1, 1996–June 1, 1998)
  Ole Gustav Gjekstad (June 1, 1998–June 1, 2005)
  Karl-Erik Bøhn (June 1, 2005–January 3, 2011)
  Ole Gustav Gjekstad (June 1, 2011–June 1, 2015)
  Tor Odvar Moen (June 1, 2015–June 1, 2018)
  Geir Oustorp (June 1, 2018–February 5, 2019)
  Lene Rantala (February 5, 2019–June 1, 2019)
  Lars Wallin Andresen (June 1, 2019–September 1, 2020)
  Are Ruud (September 1, 2020–June 1, 2021)
  Eirik Haugdal (June 1, 2021–present)

Stadium
 Name: Jotron Arena Larvik
 City: Larvik
 Capacity: 4,000 seats
 Opened: September 19, 2009
 Address: Hoffsgt. 6, 3262 Larvik

European record

References

External links
Official website

Norwegian handball clubs
Sport in Vestfold og Telemark
Larvik
Handball clubs established in 1990
1990 establishments in Norway